Kouami Justin Ayassou (born 28 September 1970) is a Togolese sprinter. He competed in the men's 4 × 100 metres relay at the 1996 Summer Olympics.

References

External links
 

1970 births
Living people
Athletes (track and field) at the 1996 Summer Olympics
Togolese male sprinters
French male sprinters
Olympic athletes of Togo
Place of birth missing (living people)
21st-century Togolese people
French masters athletes